Fiduyeh (also Romanized as Fīdūyeh; also known as Fadooyeh) is a village in Baghan Rural District, Mahmeleh District, Khonj County, Fars Province, Iran. At the 2006 census, its population was 402, in 80 families.

References 

Populated places in Khonj County